Rzepiska , is a village in the administrative district of Gmina Bukowina Tatrzańska, within Tatra County, Lesser Poland Voivodeship, in southern Poland, close to the border with Slovakia.

It is one of the 14 villages in the Polish part of the historical region of Spiš (Polish: Spisz).

References

Villages in Tatra County
Spiš
Kraków Voivodeship (1919–1939)